Reginald Green may refer to:

Reginald Green (cricketer) (1873–1940), Irish cricketer
Reginald Green (economist) (1935–2021), American economist
Reginald Green (actor), see The Cure for Love